Robert Penman (born 1891) was a Scottish footballer who played as a full back for Motherwell, Albion Rovers and St Johnstone.

Playing career
He played in the 1920 Scottish Cup Final which Albion Rovers lost to Kilmarnock. He later emigrated to Canada where he worked as a football coach in Manitoba.

References

1891 births
Date of birth unknown
Year of death unknown
Scottish footballers
Footballers from North Lanarkshire
Ashfield F.C. players
Motherwell F.C. players
Albion Rovers F.C. players
St Johnstone F.C. players
Scottish Junior Football Association players
Scottish Football League players
Association football defenders
Scottish emigrants to Canada